The Sisters is a 1957 Soviet epic film directed by Grigori Roshal. It based on Sisters (1918–1922), the first part of Aleksey Nikolayevich Tolstoy's The Road to Calvary trilogy.

Production
The Sisters was filmed in St. Petersburg, including in the Summer Garden. Music was composed by Dmitry Kabalevsky.

Plot
The Russian Empire during the First World War; two sisters in Petrograd pursue romance in the runup to the Russian Revolution.

Release

The Sisters was released in the Soviet Union on 24 September 1957, and in the West in 1959.

It was the highest-grossing film in the Soviet Union for 1957, with 42.5 million tickets sold.

References

External links

 (in Russian, no subtitles)

1957 drama films
Soviet historical drama films
Mosfilm films
Films directed by Grigori Roshal
Films set in Saint Petersburg
Films about sisters
Films set on the Russian Empire home front during World War I
1950s Russian-language films